"Mest ondt" is a Danish language hit song by Burhan G, a Danish pop singer, songwriter and producer of Kurdish origin, featuring Danish-Chilean singer Medina. "Mest ondt" (translated as What hurts the most) was released on the Danish record label Copenhagen Records. It is the first ever #1 hit for Burhan G on Tracklisten, the official Danish Singles Chart.

"Mest ondt" was not the first collaboration between Burhan G and Medina. Medina's solo hit "Kun for mig" was rereleased later in a version featuring Burhan G in 2008 alongside a third version featuring L.O.C.

Track listing
Digital download
 "Mest ondt" (feat. Medina) - 3:53

Chart performance
The single was released in March 2010 and reached number one on the Danish Singles Chart of 23 April 2010 for one week.

Release history

References

2010 singles
Number-one singles in Denmark
Burhan G songs
Danish-language songs
Medina (singer) songs
Copenhagen Records singles
2010 songs